Raymond Terrence Hoser (born 1962) is an Australian snake-catcher and author. Since 1976, he has written books and articles about official corruption in Australia. He has also written works on Australian frogs and reptiles. Hoser's work on herpetology is controversial, including his advocacy of the surgical alteration of captive snakes to remove their venom glands and his self-published herpetological taxonomy, which has been described as "taxonomic vandalism".

Career

Whistleblower
Hoser has published several works as a whistleblower. In a 1998 radio interview he said that he was "known as an anti-corruption crusader". An analysis of his work by the Rationalist Society of Australia referred to him as a "tireless investigator" and he has received praise from Brian Martin, a former president of Whistleblowers Australia.

In his 1993 book Smuggled, Hoser wrote that officials of the wildlife services in New South Wales were involved in the illegal wildlife trade.

In 1995, Hoser published The Hoser Files, detailing his encounters with Victoria Police and the Road Traffic Authority in Melbourne while working as a taxi driver. (Hoser had moved to Victoria in 1985.)

Taxonomic work
Hoser has written extensively on herpetology, with a focus on the taxonomy of Australian snakes. He was an editor of Monitor, a magazine of the Victorian Herpetological Society. Since 2009, he has self-published the Australasian Journal of Herpetology. Hoser has described several species and genera of reptiles, including Pseudechis pailsei and Acanthophis wellsi (snakes in the family Elapidae). His work on the taxonomy of the Pythoninae has been partially confirmed by later phylogenetic studies. 

Professional academic herpetologists have acknowledged Hoser as "undoubtedly knowledgeable about reptiles" but had significant criticism of his taxonomic work. Hoser's work has been described as "amateur", “vanity publishing”, not peer-reviewed, "taxonomic vandalism", extensively plagiarised, and a source of confusion. In particular, several of his descriptions are said to lack adequate detail and reference to type specimens.  As a result, herpetological societies in America, Europe and Africa have resolved to ignore or over-write Hoser's nomenclature. 

A 2021 review found that 59 of Hoser's reptile names had been over-written by other herpetologists. For example, for the reticulated python, Reynolds et al. 2013, suggest the name Malayopython be used in place of Hoser's Broghammerus. Similarly, for two species of alligator snapping turtle, Thomas et al. 2014 give new names to over-write Hoser's names. The new names have found widespread acceptance in preference of Hoser's names. 

Hoser responded to the over-writing by declaring the new names to be junior synonyms which thus are invalid according to the rules of the International Code of Zoological Nomenclature (the Code). In 2013, he applied to the International Commission on Zoological Nomenclature (ICZN) to confirm that his names were "available" (i.e. had been validly published), using the name Spracklandus as a test case. In 2021, the ICZN responded that it found “no basis under the provisions of the Code for regarding the name Spracklandus as unavailable, nor for regarding any of issues 1–24 of Australasian Journal of Herpetology as being unpublished in the sense of the Code”. ICZN Commissioner Frank Krell wrote that herpetologists' voluntary decision to ignore and overwrite Hoser's names "might be a better way forward than a suppression of Hoser's works by the ICZN".

Snake handling 
Hoser has a business as a snake handler and provides reptiles for children’s birthday parties and catching and moving snakes in urban areas. As part of his business, he claims "Snakeman" (and others) as trademarks, names which he has taken steps to defend on several occasions. He once criticized the zookeeper, conservationist and television personality Steve Irwin for giving people "false ideas about how to behave around snakes". 

Hoser is an advocate of surgically altering snakes to inhibit the production of venom. The procedure for creating venomoid snakes is regarded as controversial. A 2008 government tribunal ruled that Hoser's venomoid snakes cannot be handled by members of the public, due to the risk of the venom glands regrowing.

Legal proceedings
In 2001, the Victorian Supreme Court used the offence of scandalising the court to fine Hoser $5,000 after he published names of two county court judges and two magistrates in a book entitled Victoria Police Corruption with allegations of bias and improper conduct.<ref>- "Scandalising the Court" , Press Gazette, 10 October 2003. Retrieved 12 October 2008</ref> Hoser's 2003 appeal against the charge was unsuccessful and he was found guilty of a second contempt charge which was originally dismissed.

In 2011, Hoser was convicted and fined $12,000 in the County Court for demonstrating with venomous snakes less than three metres from the public, working in accessible pits and demonstrating in a way that put the animals at risk of theft. He allowed his 10-year-old daughter to be bitten five times by venomoid specimens of two species of highly venomous snakes, an inland taipan and a common death adder, to demonstrate that his venomoid snakes were harmless. The manager of the shopping center where Hoser performed claimed that Hoser's performance was not consistent with his act description and said that he would not be allowed back. Following this incident, the Victorian Department of Sustainability and Environment (DSE) suspended Hoser's commercial wildlife demonstrator license and his authorisation to hold snake-handling courses and use wildlife in film and television. Hoser said that he would apply to the courts for an emergency injunction against this suspension.

In 2012, Judge Jenkins found that Hoser intentionally allowed two snakes to bite his daughter seven times, and compromised both the safety of the audience and the welfare of the snakes during his demonstration. In March 2012, Jenkins upheld an appeal by Hoser of the DSE actions against him, fining him $4,000 under the Wildlife Safety Act and ordering him to pay the costs of the DSE of $8,000. Jenkins found that "through his demeanour and evidence, displayed a contempt and reckless disregard for the licence conditions. He has conducted his demonstrations in a manner which seriously compromises the welfare of the snakes he is displaying and the safety and well-being of audience members, including children and, on one occasion, his own daughter." In March 2013, Justice Robert Redlich of the Victoria Court of Appeal recommended that Hoser hire a lawyer to represent him rather than representing himself, and adjourned the hearing until 13 June 2013. In May 2013, Hoser appealed to the Victoria Court of Appeal in an attempt to overturn the Department of Sustainability and Environment's (DSE) decision to cancel his wildlife demonstrators licence and Victorian Civil and Administrative Tribunal (VCAT) deputy president Judge Pamela Jenkins's decision in 2012 to uphold that DSE cancellation of his license.

In 2015, VCAT member Gerard Butcher cleared Hoser to resume demonstrations for schoolchildren.

In 2018, Hoser sued Sportsbet, alleging the bookmaker infringed on his trademark by using the words "snake man" in three TV ads. In October 2018, the judge dismissed the claim for one of three relevant adverts and Hoser was ordered to pay the defendant's legal costs as agreed, which were in fact written off. Sportsbet in turn agreed to stop running all three offending adverts and proceedings were discontinued in relation to the two adverts that the judge had not ruled on.

Candidate for local and state government
In 2012, Hoser ran for council of the City of Manningham (Mullum Mullum ward), but failed to win one of three positions. He received 4.31% of the primary vote.

In 1999, Hoser ran in the Victorian state election 1999 in Frankston East district. He received the fewest votes (11 out of 26,842 votes or 0.04% of first preference votes).

Works
Hoser has written letters to major newspapers, and signs these in three ways: with his own name, a random one to maintain anonymity, and obvious joke names such as Wayne Kerr and Wayne King.

Books
 Australian Reptiles & Frogs, (238pp) Pierson & Co., 1989 
 Endangered Animals of Australia, Pierson & Co., 1991 
 Smuggled : The Underground Trade in Australia's Wildlife. Apollo Books, 1993. 
 The Hoser Files – The Fight Against Entrenched Official Corruption. (332 pp.) Kotabi, 1995. 
 Smuggled-2: Wildlife Trafficking, Crime and Corruption in Australia. Kotabi, 1996. 
 Victoria Police Corruption. (736 pp.) Kotabi, 1999. 
 Victoria Police Corruption 2. (800 pp.) Kotabi, 2000. 
 Taxi''. Kotabi, 2000.  (V. 1)  (V. 2)

References

External links 
 Smuggled.com by Raymond Hoser.
 Australian Library Collections

Australian non-fiction writers
Australian herpetologists
Australian whistleblowers
Australian nature writers
1962 births
Living people